Blockadia is a global anti-extractivism movement; and a roving, transnational conflict zone where everyday people obstruct development of extractive projects, especially in the fossil fuel industry. Blockadia resistance movements differ from mainstream environmentalism by use of confrontational tactics such as civil disobedience, mass arrests, lockdowns, and blockades to contest perceived threats arising from extractivist projects’ contributions to global climate change and local environmental injustice. Some researchers have concluded that Blockadia contributes to a transition toward a more just society.

Blockadia's divergence from mainstream environmentalism was initially identified in relation to environmental conflicts that contested development of the Alberta Tar Sands. Increasing use of Blockadia tactics may indicate that more people are losing trust in capitalism’s ability to avert a climate crisis.

Background 
Failure of corporations and governments to address the climate crisis has been described as state-corporate crime. In particular, scholars have presented evidence that collusion between the Canadian government and multi-national corporations to develop of the Alberta Tar Sands is an example of state-corporate crime, because tar sands oil is especially resource intensive to extract, refine, and transport. Tar sands contribute disproportionately to carbon emissions. These scholars say that tar sands’ contributions to global warming and ecological destruction constitute an assault on humans and other species, including local residents and First Nations communities.

Blockadia's divergence from mainstream environmentalism took place in the context of resistance to tar sands development with this understanding of tar sands'  contribution to the climate crisis.

History 
Blockadia's confrontational tactics have a long history in environmental activism. Joan Martinez-Alier points to the Movement for the Survival of the Ogoni People as an important precedent in the use of Blockadia tactics against the fossil fuel industry. 

Naomi Klein attributes the origin of the term Blockadia to the activist group Tar Sands Blockade during their resistance to the Keystone XL pipeline in 2012. The group produced an hour-long documentary Blockadia Rising (2013) that described the dangers of tar sands extraction and the group's direct actions, which included a network of blockades and tree-sits that they occupied for 86 days, forcing TransCanada to reroute the pipeline.

Klein popularised the term in her 2014 book This Changes Everything to describe a “roving transnational conflict zone…where regular people…are trying to stop this era of extreme extraction with their bodies or in the courts.” Klein writes that.Blockadia is not a specific location on a map but rather a roving transnational conflict zone that is cropping up with increasing frequency and intensity wherever extractive projects are attempting to dig and drill, whether for open-pit mines, or gas fracking, or tar sands oil pipelines.The term also had early associations with the Idle No More movement.

The struggle against the Keystone XL pipeline effectively introduced Blockadia to the American public.

Examples 
The Environmental Justice Atlas has complied several examples of Blockadia campaigns from around the world.

Civil society in South Africa has restructured its challenges to state-supported extractivist projects with Blockadia tactics in response to the Marikana massacre of mine workers in 2012.

Characteristics 
In addition to its adoption of confrontational tactics, Blockadia movements differ from mainstream environmentalism by integrating environmental justice concerns and building diverse grassroots coalitions, where environmentalism had previously emphasised NIMBY campaigns, celebrity environmentalism, and advocacy for legislative action.

Blockadia participants tend to be more concerned with legitimacy than legality, and are responding to a perceived planetary emergency. Blockadia movements have formed unexpected alliances between grassroots groups responding to perceived local threats.

Blockadia relies primarily on decentralised leadership and frequently organises actions through social media.  

Martinez Alier and other scholars describe Blockadia as a network of glocal campaigns with a deeply democratic approach: participants are aware of the connections between local injustice and the global climate crisis. Blockadia’s strategies include legal approaches asserting the right to a healthy environment and protecting local means of subsistence.

In popular culture 
Stephen Collis’s poetry collection The Barricades Project includes a volume titled “Once in Blockadia” that critiques neoliberalism and cultural nationalism while also noting that poetic critique is insufficient resistance to these issues.

References 

Environmental justice
Nonviolent occupation
Anti-capitalism